Appiano Gentile is a comune (municipality) in the Province of Como in the Italian region Lombardy, located about  northwest of Milan and about  southwest of Como.

The city borders the following municipalities: Beregazzo con Figliaro, Bulgarograsso, Carbonate, Castelnuovo Bozzente, Guanzate, Lurago Marinone, Lurate Caccivio, Oltrona di San Mamette, Tradate (VA), Veniano
 
Appiano received the honorary title of city with a presidential decree of February 28, 2009.

The main sights is the church of Santo Stefano, housing works from Nuvolone and Isidoro Bianchi. The town is also home to the training ground of Serie A side Inter Milan.

References

Cities and towns in Lombardy